Charles Aken Fairbridge (1824 - 1893) was a book collector and a conservative member of the Parliament of the Cape of Good Hope.

Early life
Fairbridge was born in Cape Town, the son of recent and relatively affluent British settlers. His father was District Surgeon, based in Uitenhage where Charles Aken grew up. He was sent by his parents to England in 1837 to complete his education. Upon returning to the Cape he became partner in the law firm Fairbridge, Arderne and Lawton, taking special interest in maritime law.

He married the daughter of William George Anderson, one of the original Directors of Old Mutual and in 1862 they settled in Sea Point, Cape Town.

Political career
Fairbridge had entered the first Cape Parliament in 1854, representing Caledon District until 1858.

He was involved in the establishment of the national museum. In 1874 he was requested to re-design the arms of the Cape Colony, and produced the emblem that was used by the Cape Province up until the late 20th century. 
 
In 1874 he also returned to Parliament, this time as one of the members representing Cape Town. He was a strong opponent of the attempts by Lord Carnarvon in the late 1870s to enforce a British confederation on southern Africa.

Bibliophile
He was chiefly known as a book collector though, with an enormous library of considerable value. It was later donated to the South African Library.

Fairbridge died on 4 July 1893, after returning from a holiday in Tenerife.

References

1824 births
1893 deaths
Cape Colony politicians
Members of the House of Assembly of the Cape Colony
Book and manuscript collectors
19th-century South African lawyers